Meron is a surname. Notable people with the name include:
 Eduard Meron (born 1938), Israeli Olympic weightlifter
 Hanna Meron or Hanna Maron, Israeli actress
 Neil Meron, American film producer
 Theodor Meron, President of the International Criminal Tribunal for the former Yugoslavia and Presiding Judge of the Appeals Chambers of the International Criminal Tribunal for Rwanda and the ICTY
 Moshe Meron (born Moshe Segal), Israeli lawyer and former politician